The 2014 season was AIK's 123rd in existence, their 86th season in Allsvenskan and their 9th consecutive season in the league. The team competed in the Allsvenskan and UEFA Europa League.

Season events
Prior to the start of the season, AIK announced the signings of Panajotis Dimitriadis and Niclas Eliasson to four-year contracts and Eero Markkanen to a three-year contract. Whilst both Daniel Gustavsson and Alhassan Kamara left to join Örebro.

On 6 January, Daniel Majstorović left AIK after his contract was terminated by mutual consent.

On 13 January, AIK announced that Christian Kouakou had let the club to sign for IF Brommapojkarna.

On 16 January, AIK announced the return of Kenny Pavey on a two-year contract from Östers.

On 28 January, AIK announced the return of Teteh Bangura on loan until August 2014, from Bursaspor.

On 17 February, AIK announced that Niklas Backman had been sold to Dalian Aerbin.

On 18 July, AIK announced that Robin Quaison had left the club to join Palermo.

On 23 July, AIK announced that Eero Markkanen had left the club to join Real Madrid.

On 25 July, AIK announced the signing of Sauli Väisänen from Honka.

On 6 August, AIK announced that Teteh Bangura would leave the club at the end of his loan spell on 31 August.

On 11 August, AIK announced the loan signing of Gabriel Ferreyra from Boca Juniors, until 31 December 2015.

Squad

Transfers

In

Loans in

Out

Released

Friendlies

Competitions

Overview

Allsvenskan

League table

Results summary

Results by round

Results

Svenska Cupen

The Group Stage took place during the 2015 season.

UEFA Europa League

Qualifying rounds

Squad statistics

Appearances and goals

|-
|colspan="16"|Players away on loan:
|-
|colspan="16"|Players who appeared for AIK but left during the season:

|}

Goal scorers

Clean sheets

Disciplinary record

References

AIK Fotboll seasons
AIK Fotboll season